The Isaac Newton Clark House is a historic one-and-a-half-story house in Sutton, Nebraska. It was built in 1877 for Isaac Newton Clark, a teacher-turned-businessman from Ohio who served in the Union Army during the American Civil War in Illinois and eventually co-founded the city of Sutton. The house was designed in the Gothic Revival style, with a Neoclassical porch added in 1916. It has been listed on the National Register of Historic Places since December 15, 1983.

References

		
National Register of Historic Places in Clay County, Nebraska
Gothic Revival architecture in Nebraska
Houses completed in 1877
1877 establishments in Nebraska